The 2017 Monster Energy FIM Speedway World Cup (SWC) was the seventeenth and the last FIM Speedway World Cup, the annual international speedway world championship tournament. It took place between 1 July and 8 July 2017 and involved nine national teams. Poland successfully defended their 2016 title. The competition was replaced by the Speedway of Nations.

Qualification

 Riga - 25 June 2017

Qualified teams

Tournament

Final classification

See also
 2017 Speedway Grand Prix

References

 
2017 in speedway
2017